Sobremonte is the last name of Rafael de Sobremonte, 3rd Marquis of Sobremonte, viceroy of the Viceroyalty of the Río de la Plata. 

Sobremonte may also refer to:
 Sobremonte Department of Córdoba, Argentina
 Marquis of Sobremonte provincial historical museum in Córdoba, Argentina